Vedran Celjak (born 13 August 1991) is a Croatian professional footballer who plays as a right-back for Italian  club Lecco.

Club career
On 20 November 2018, Celjak signed with Sambenedettese.

On 12 August 2019, he moved to Avellino.

On 24 August 2020 he joined Lecco.

References

External links
Padova Interview

1991 births
Living people
People from Zabok
Association football fullbacks
Croatian footballers
Croatia youth international footballers
Croatia under-21 international footballers
NK Zagreb players
U.C. Sampdoria players
U.S. Pergolettese 1932 players
F.C. Grosseto S.S.D. players
Calcio Padova players
Benevento Calcio players
U.S. Alessandria Calcio 1912 players
A.S. Sambenedettese players
U.S. Avellino 1912 players
Calcio Lecco 1912 players
Croatian Football League players
Serie B players
Serie C players
Croatian expatriate footballers
Expatriate footballers in Italy
Croatian expatriate sportspeople in Italy